Todd Edward Imperatrice (born December 9, 1972), known professionally as Todd Edwards, is an American garage house record producer, DJ and singer from Bloomfield, New Jersey. He began producing primarily for New York's Nervous Records in the 1990s, including under aliases such as the Messenger and the Sample Choir. Edwards' music is known for its influence on the UK garage scene that developed in the United Kingdom in the mid-1990s.

Beginning with his 1993 single "Guide My Soul," Edwards became a chief inspiration for the speed garage genre. His work is known for his "innovative blend of rhythmic, cut-and-paste vocal samples, rubbery basslines, and slapping percussion," which showcased an intensive sampling and remixing technique in which vocals are chopped into micro-sized sections. His 1994 single "Saved My Life" became a club hit in the UK. In 1999, Nervous collected several of his productions on the compilation Todd Edwards' Nervous Tracks and i! Records released the LP Prima Edizione, collecting several more tracks from this era.

Edwards has remixed hundreds of artists, including Wildchild, St. Germain, Benjamin Diamond, Justice, Klaxons and Dimitri from Paris. Edwards co-produced and performed vocals on the Daft Punk song "Face to Face" from the album Discovery (2001). Edwards worked again with Daft Punk, co-writing, co-producing and contributing vocals to the song "Fragments of Time" from their 2013 album Random Access Memories, for which he won a Grammy.

Early life and career
Todd Edwards grew up in Bloomfield, New Jersey. His father was a carpet salesman while his mother was a receptionist at Lincoln Technical Institute. He started playing the piano at around 3 years old. Amongst his biggest influences were Prince, Neil Diamond, and Peter Brown.

Edwards began his musical career around 1992. He employs vocal reconstruction techniques to his songs, creating a unique vocal collage set to a four-on-the-floor beat. Marc "MK" Kinchen, who is primarily responsible for pioneering this technique, is one of Edwards's influences.

Edwards became a committed Christian in the 1990s after having negative experiences with religion in his youth. This is evident by recurring hidden messages found in his compositions, which often contain religious phrases.

Beginnings
In his early records, Todd Edwards was influenced by house music and grew into the UK garage and 2-step garage scene. Inspired by Todd Terry, MK, and experiences from his own trials and errors, Todd Edwards developed a unique sound of vocal sampling in place of musical instrument sampling on his tracks. In 1995, there was some talk developing about Edwards. His manager was approached by St. Germain, who asked Edwards to do a remix of his song, "Alabama Blues". Although Edwards has produced and remixed some great remixes in this time, he didn't begin to DJ until the early 2000s. He went out gradually landing more gigs in the UK, hoping to land a bigger one than the next. For an American native, Edwards was quick to gain underground popularity in Europe.

2001–present
Edwards co-produced and performed vocals on the Daft Punk song "Face to Face" from the album Discovery. The song reached No. 1 on the Billboard Club chart in 2004. In 2006, Edwards sang on each track of the LP Odyssey, using multiple aliases on the album.

In 2012, Edwards released the EP I Want You Back made in collaboration with French producer Surkin. In April 2013, Edwards revealed that he had contributed to Daft Punk's album Random Access Memories; he expressed that it was difficult keeping his involvement a secret. He provided vocals for and co-wrote the song "Fragments of Time", as well as providing additional production.

In 2013, Edwards appeared alongside many other garage pioneers in a documentary exploring the legacy of UK garage, Rewind 4Ever: The History of UK Garage.

At the 2014 Grammy Awards, Random Access Memories won awards for Best Dance/Electronica Album as well as Album of the Year; Edward's contributions to "Fragments of Time" thus earned him his first Grammy.

Red Bull Music Academy teamed up with director Ralf Schmerberg to produce What Difference Does It Make: A Film About Making Music for its fifteenth anniversary. The film features Edwards sharing his thoughts and beliefs on the music industry. Edwards continues to produce and remix tracks today, with planned tours for the future. One of his projects is a vocal album featuring his own singing and co-produced by engineer Peter Franco. Edwards noted that Thomas Bangalter of Daft Punk convinced him to pursue such a project, and may oversee it.

In May 2021, Edwards's back catalogue was released on streaming services through Defected Records.

He currently resides in Los Angeles.

Discography

Albums
 Todd Edwards' Nervous Tracks (1999)
 Prima Edizione (1999)
 Nervous Innovator Series Vol 4/5 (2000)
 Full On (Volume 1) (2001)
 Full On (Volume 2) (2003)
 New Trend Sounds (2004)
 New Trend Sounds (Classics, Remixes & Beyond) (2004)
 Odyssey (2006)
 Full On (Volume 3) (2007)

Singles and EPs

 "Guide My Soul" (1993) (as the Messenger)
 "F.O.T." (1994)
 "Underground People" (collab. DJ Shorty) (1995)
 "Dancing for Heaven" (1995)
 "Stronger" (1995)
 "New Trend's Sound" (1995)
 "Saved My Life" (1995)
 "Saved My Life" (Remixes) (1995) - UK #69
 "Fly Away (One)" (1996)
 "Push the Love" (1997)
 "Never Far from You" (1998)
 "41:13" (1998)
 The Prima EP (1998)
 "One Day" (collab. Tuff Jam) (1999)
 "Look Out" (1999)
 Incidental EP (2000)
 "Shut the Door" (2000)
 "Show Me a Sign" (2000)
 "Saved My Life" (2000)
 2 EP (2001)
 "Restless Soul" (2001)
 "Full On (Volume 1)" (Unmixed) (2001)
 "Shut the Door" (Remixes) (2002)
 "New Trends 2002" (2002)
 "New Trends 1995" (2002)
 "You Came to Me" (2002)
 "You're the One" (2003)
 "Beckon Call" (2003)
 "Face to Face" (collab. Daft Punk) (2003)
 "Full On (Volume 2)" (Unmixed) (2003)
 "Full On (Volume 2)" (Remixes) (2003)
 "Stop the Fighting" (2003)
 "Can't Live Without You" (Reissue) (2003)
 "Are You There" (2003)
 "Stormy Day" (collab. Filthy Rich) (2004)
 "Stormy Day" (collab. Filthy Rich) (Remixes) (2004)
 "Hold On to Me" (2004)
 "Winter Behaviour" (2004)
 "Who You Are" (2004)
 "When Your Alone" (2004)
 "New Trends Sounds 2004 (Part 1)" (2004)
 "New Trends Sounds 2004 (Part 2)" (2004)
 "New Trends Sounds 2004 (Part 3)" (2004)
 "Mystery" (2005)
 "Like a Fire" (2005)
 "Heaven" (2005)
 "No Scrubs" (2005)
 "The Journey" (2006)
 "Far Away" (2006)
 "Next to You" (2007)
 "I Might Be" (2010)
 "I Doubted You" (2010)
 "Stand Right Now" (2010)
 "Head Held High" (2011)
 Shall Go EP (2012)
 "Love Inside" (2012)
 Searching EP (2012)
 No Place Like London EP (2012)
"Javid Khan" (2013)
"I've Still Got Sunshine" (collab. Robert Lux) (2014)
"I Want To Be In Fabric" (2016)
"Come Together) (collab. Golf Clap) (2017)
"Catch My Breath" (2017)
"Is It Wrong" (2017)
 "You're Sorry" (2019) - U.S. Dance #1
"Deeper" (collab. Sinden) (2019)
"Getting There From Here" (collab. Poolside and Turbotito) (2020)
"Lover 4 Now" (collab. Groove Armada) (2020)
"Inspire Me" (2020)
"The Chant" (2021)
"My Angel" (collab. Electric Enemy) (2021)
"Think I'm In Love" (collab. Vantage) (2021)

Remixes

 Fatboy Slim – "Rockafeller Skank" (Todd Edwards Remix) (2021)
 Four of Diamonds – "Blind" (Todd Edwards Remix) (2019)
 Disclosure – "White Noise" (Todd Edwards Edit) (2015)
 LION BABE featuring Childish Gambino – "Jump Hi (Todd Edwards Remix)" (2014)
 Netsky featuring Beth Ditto – "Running Low (Todd Edwards Remix)" (2014)
 Sam Smith – "Lay Me Down (Todd Edwards Remix)" (2014)
 Chase & Status featuring Jacob Banks – "Alive (Todd Edwards Remix)" (2014)
 Rudimental – "Waiting All Night (Todd Edwards Vocal Mix)" (2013)
 Phoenix – "Entertainment (Todd Edwards Remix)" (2013)
 Bo Saris – "The Addict (Todd Edwards Remix)" (2013)
 Jessie Ware – "No To Love (Todd Edwards Remix)" (2012)
 Toxic Avenger – "Toxic Is Dead (Todd Edwards Remix)" (2012)
 One Dark Martian – "Falling (Todd Edwards Remix)" (2012)
 Infinity Ink – "Infinity (Todd Edwards Remix)" (2012)
 LOL Boys – "Changes (Todd Edwards Remix)" (2012)
 Modestep – "Show Me A Sign (Todd Edwards Remix)" (2012)
 Kastle – "Time Traveler (Todd Edwards Remix)" (2011)
 Matthew Dear – "Slowdance (Todd Edwards Remix)" (2011)
 Wretch 32 – "Forgiveness (Todd Edwards Take Me To Church Dub)" (2011)
 Hot Chip – "Hand Me Down Your Love (Todd Edward Micro Chip Remix)" (2010)
 Kingdom featuring Shyvonne – "Mind Reader (Todd Edwards Remix)" (2010)
 Spank Rock – "What It Look Like (Todd Edwards Remix)" (2010)
 Appaloosa – "The Day (We Feel In Love) [Todd Edwards Liturgical Mix]" (2009)
 Surkin – "Next Of Kin (Todd Edwards Re-Kindled Mix)" (2008)
 Justice – "DVNO (Todd Edwards' Sunshine Brothers Remix)" (2008)
 Klaxons – "Gravity's Rainbow (Todd Edwards Remix)" (2007)
 TLC – "No Scrubs (Todd Edwards Remix)" (2006)
 Beyoncé – "Crazy In Love (Todd Edwards Remix)" (2005)
 Paul Johnson – "She Got Me On (Todd Edwards Remix)" (2005)
 Zoot Woman – "Taken It All (Todd Edwards 'Soul Line' Remix)" (2004)
 Space Cowboy – "Crazy Talk (Todd Edwards Remix)" (2003)
 Nio – "Do You Think You're Special? (Todd Edwards So Special UK Remix)" (2003)
 Boniface – "Cheeky (Todd Edwards 'Time Like No Other' Remix)" (2002)
 Craig David – "What's Your Flava? (Todd Edwards Underground Flava Mix)" (2002)
 Daniel Bedingfield – "James Dean (I Wanna Know) [Todd Edwards Life Line Vocal Remix)" (2002)
 St. Germain – "Sure Thing (Todd Edwards Remix)" (2001)
 Phoenix – "If I Ever Feel Better (Todd Edwards Remix)" (2000)
 Moloko – "Pure Pleasure Seeker (Todd Edwards Mix)" (2000)
 MJ Cole – "Crazy Love (Todd Edwards Save Your Crys Dub)" (2000)
 Lonyo - "In Ayia Napa (Todd Edwards Perfect Dub)"
 Benjamin Diamond – "Little Scare (Todd Edwards Remix)" (2000)
 Kevin Yost – "If She Only Knew (Todd Edward's She Only Knew Disco Remix)" (1999)
 Ultymate featuring Jacquee Bennett – Vybe (Todd Edwards Remix)" (1998)
 Mad Moses - Panther Party (Todd Edwards Remix) (1997)
 Kristine Blond – "Love Shy (Todd Edwards Remix)" (1997)
 Robin S. – "Show Me Love (Todd Edwards Remix)" (1997)
 Da Mob featuring Jocelyn Brown – "Fun (Todd Edwards Remix)" (1997) 
 Indo – "R U Sleeping (Todd Edwards Remix)" (1996)
 The Ride Committee featuring Roxy – Accident (Todd Edwards Dub) (1995)
 Veda Simpson – "Oohhh Baby (Todd Edwards Remix)" (1994)

Collaborations
 "I Want You Back" (with Surkin) (2012)
 "I've Still Got Sunshine" (with Robert Lux) (2014)
 "Jaco" (with Nick Hook & Kilo Kish) (2014)
 "Go Crazy" (Pete Tong and Her-o featuring Todd Edwards) (2019)
 "Getting There from Here" (with Poolside) (2020)
 "Lover 4 Now" (Groove Armada featuring Todd Edwards) (2020)

Production credits
 Daft Punk – "Face to Face" (2001) - U.S. Dance #1
 Daft Punk – "Fragments of Time" (2013)

References

External links
 
 
New York Times Style Magazine – Q. & A. | Daft Punk’s Secret Weapon: Producer Todd Edwards
LWE Interviews Todd Edwards
Interview with Todd Edwards (Scion A/V)
Todd Edwards The Stylus Interview
XLR8R Born Again Todd Edwards
Todd Edwards (Pitchfork)

1972 births
Living people
American DJs
American electronic musicians
American garage house musicians
American house musicians
Record producers from New Jersey
Musicians from New Jersey
People from Bloomfield, New Jersey
Speed garage musicians
UK garage musicians
Grammy Award winners
Deep house musicians
Electronic dance music DJs
Locked On Records artists